Petri Tiainen (born 26 September 1966) is a retired Finnish former football attacking midfielder.

He played for Kuusysi Lahti from 1984 to 1986, AFC Ajax from 1986 to 1989, HJK Helsinki from 1989 to 1992, MyPa from 1994 to 1997 and FC Lahti in 1998. He was capped 13 times for Finland, scoring 2 goals. He won the Finnish Footballer of the Year award in 1986.

References

1966 births
Living people
Association football midfielders
Finnish footballers
Finland international footballers
Eredivisie players
AFC Ajax players
Helsingin Jalkapalloklubi players
Myllykosken Pallo −47 players
FC Lahti players
Veikkausliiga players
Finnish expatriate footballers
Expatriate footballers in the Netherlands
Finnish expatriate sportspeople in the Netherlands
Mestaruussarja players
Sportspeople from Lahti